Frank Padavan (October 31, 1934 – October 8, 2018) was an American engineer and politician. He served as a New York state senator representing District 11, located in Queens County. His district included the communities of Queens Village, Flushing, Bayside, Whitestone, Douglaston, Little Neck, College Point, Bellerose, Hollis, Jamaica Estates, Floral Park, and Glen Oaks. A Republican, Padavan lost his 2010 bid for re-election to Democrat Tony Avella.

Life and career
Padavan attended Newtown High School in Elmhurst, New York. He received his undergraduate degree in electrical engineering from Brooklyn Polytechnic Institute in 1956, and went on to receive an M.B.A. from New York University in 1963. Between 1955 and 1968, he worked as an engineer at Westinghouse Electric Corporation.

Padavan spent 30 years as a reserve member of the U.S. Army Corps of Engineers, attaining the rank of colonel. During his military career, Padavan served as commanding officer of the 411th Engineer Brigade and chief of staff, 77th ARCOM, headquarters for New York State's Army Reserve. He was a graduate of the United States Army Command and General Staff College and completed the Defense Strategy Course.

In 1968, Padavan was appointed Deputy Commissioner of the New York City Department of Buildings, a position in which he remained until his election to the State Senate in 1972. He was a member of the New York State Senate from 1973 to 2010.

Padavan died October 8, 2018, at New York–Presbyterian Hospital. He was 83.

See also
 2009 New York State Senate leadership crisis

References

External links

 

1934 births
2018 deaths
Republican Party New York (state) state senators
New York University Stern School of Business alumni
Politicians from Brooklyn
People from Queens, New York
People from Bellerose, New York
Military personnel from New York City
United States Army Corps of Engineers personnel
United States Army Command and General Staff College alumni
Polytechnic Institute of New York University alumni
Engineers from New York City
21st-century American politicians